The M5 cycleway is a predominantly on road  cycleway generally aligned with the M5 motorway in south-western Sydney, New South Wales, Australia. The eastern terminus of the cycleway is in  where it connects with the Cooks River cycleway.  The southwestern terminus of the cycleway is in Prestons where is connects with the M7 cycleway. The cycleway does not have a separate cycle lane or path, instead cyclists use the breakdown lane.

Cycling in the M5 East Tunnel is prohibited.

Route

As of June 2016, due to road works near the King Georges Road interchange, the breakdown lane is closed and cyclists must exit and ride through back streets. A connection to Salt Pan Creek shared path to Bankstown is possible at the Riverwood end.

See also
Bike paths in Sydney
Cycling in New South Wales
Cycling in Sydney

References

External links
Bicycle NSW website

Cycleways in Australia
Cycling in Sydney